The 2004 FIA GT Brno 500 km was the fifth round the 2004 FIA GT Championship season.  It took place at the Brno Circuit, Czech Republic, on May 30, 2004.

Official results
Class winners in bold.  Cars failing to complete 70% of winner's distance marked as Not Classified (NC).

Statistics
 Pole position – #1 BMS Scuderia Italia – 1:56.654
 Fastest lap – #5 Vitaphone Racing Team – 1:59.417
 Average speed – 156.480 km/h

References

 
 
 

B